Rattlesnake tail (Crassula barklyi) is a perennial succulent plant native to Lesotho, Namibia, South Africa, and Eswatini.

Synonyms
 Crassula teres Marloth
 Tetraphyle barklyi (N.E.Br.) P.V.Heath

References

 The Plant List entry
 Encyclopedia of Life entry
 Hortipedia entry
 JSTOR entry

barklyi
Taxa named by N. E. Brown